Dodge No. 4 State Park is a public recreation area covering  on the north shore of Cass Lake in Oakland County, northern Metro Detroit, Michigan. The state park occupies a mile of shoreline on the  lake.

History
The park was created in 1922 when Dodge Brothers Corporation donated the land, stipulating that it be maintained as a public park in perpetuity.

Activities and amenities
The park offers swimming, fishing for bass, pike, perch and trout, a fishing pier, picnicking facilities, and boat ramp.

References

External links 
Dodge No. 4 State Park Michigan Department of Natural Resources
Dodge No. 4 State Park Map Michigan Department of Natural Resources

State parks of Michigan
Protected areas of Oakland County, Michigan
Protected areas established in 1922
1922 establishments in Michigan
IUCN Category III
Tourist attractions in Oakland County, Michigan
Dodge